Silana was a town in the Histiaeotis in the northwest of ancient Thessaly, near the frontiers of Athamania, mentioned along with Gomphi and Tricca by Livy.

Its site remains unlocated.

References

Populated places in ancient Thessaly
Former populated places in Greece
Histiaeotis
Lost ancient cities and towns